WCNN (680 kHz) is an AM radio station licensed to North Atlanta and serving the Atlanta-area radio market. It is owned by Dickey Broadcasting and airs a sports radio format. The station is commonly known by the on-air branding as "The Fan". Local sports shows are heard weekdays with the ESPN Radio Network airing nights and weekends. WCNN is the flagship of the Atlanta Braves Radio Network.

WCNN broadcasts with a power of 50,000 watts during the daytime, and 10,000 watts at night, using a directional antenna at all times to protect other stations on AM 680 including KNBR from San Francisco. WCNN's transmitter and towers are located near Norcross, Georgia, northeast of Atlanta. WCNN is also heard on a 250-watt FM translator, W229AG at 93.7 MHz.

The station formerly broadcast the audio portion of the CNN Headline News channel (hence its current call sign), an all-news radio format that the station pioneered in the 1980s and re-appeared on the station later in the station's history.

History
On September 1, 1965, the station signed on as WRNG,  Atlanta's first talk radio station. The last three letters of the call sign represented the station's branding as "Ring Radio," as in the ringing of a telephone.  The station was originally a daytimer operating at 5,000 watts but having to sign-off at night.  It was the first broadcast home of talk radio personality Neal Boortz, who went onto a long career at WSB and syndicated nationally. Other, now well known talk radio personalities were also heard on the station, including Ronn Owens, later at KGO in San Francisco, Southern Humorist Ludlow Porch, and Barry Young, later at KFYI in Phoenix.

In 1982, the station began an experiment by broadcasting the audio feed of CNN Headline News. The call letters were changed to WCNN, a nod to CNN's headquarters being in Atlanta.

In February 1987, the station switched to an adult standards radio format and changed its call letters to WGTW. Its call sign was a reference to the Atlanta-based classic movie Gone with the Wind, which, coincidentally, is the favorite movie of CNN founder Ted Turner. The station went by the branding "Stardust 680" during that time. The radio format failed to gain ratings in the market.

In late 1988, chief engineer Bob Mayben and his staff built elaborate studios in the CNN Center (formerly known as The Omni) and became WCNN "All News 680", with a 24-hour local news format. The CNN Headline News audio returned in June 1990, when the local all-news format failed to generate sufficient ratings. In 1995, WCNN was leased to Cox Radio for a 5-year term. The radio format was switched to Sports Talk as "680 The Fan". In 1998, the format switched to news/talk to complement WSB's programming. In 2000, when the LMA expired, control of WCNN returned to Dickey Broadcasting. The "680 The Fan" branding and the sports radio format returned to WCNN.

WCNN was the flagship station of the Atlanta Thrashers before the Thrashers moved to Winnipeg, Manitoba, Canada, and was the flagship of the Atlanta Hawks Radio Network before rival WZGC gained the rights in 2013. It has been the flagship station of the Atlanta Braves Radio Network since 2010. WCNN is also the flagship station of Georgia Tech Yellow Jackets football and men’s basketball. In 2019, the station became the flagship of Atlanta Gladiators hockey.

WCNN is now an affiliate of ESPN Radio  after years of carrying CBS Sports Radio, NBC Sports Radio and Fox Sports Radio programming.

On November 30, 2010, WCNN got an FM simulcast on broadcast translator W229AG FM 93.7.  In 2010, that station was actually assigned to carry WWWQ FM 99.7 HD3.  It is located on Sweat Mountain, and for several years previously carried KAWZ FM, a Christian broadcasting station which feeds hundreds of translator stations from Calvary Chapel in Twin Falls, Idaho.  It had Sandy Plains and now Atlanta as its community of license.  99X was reportedly set to move to this station, which had a construction permit granted in July 2010 to relocate to the same tower near North Druid Hills as WWWQ and W250BC, and has the same power but somewhat lower height (and therefore broadcast range) as 99X has on W250BC.  The station was still owned by Calvary Chapel of Twin Falls, when it filed for the permit in April 2010.  After being approved in early July, Calvary applied just a few days later to transfer ownership of the station to Cumulus for $400,000.  It is now licensed to Cumulus Licensing LLC and resides on the WWWQ tower.

During the 2021 postseason, the Atlanta Braves Radio Network's coverage of their NLDS, NLCS and World Series appearances were carried on its online stream without geo-blocking restrictions. This has since continued into the 2022 season.

Programming
WCNN is also an affiliate of the Performance Racing Network, which owns the Atlanta Motor Speedway in Hampton, Georgia.

References

External links
FCC History Cards for WCNN

Sports radio stations in the United States
CNN
Radio stations established in 1967
1967 establishments in Georgia (U.S. state)
ESPN Radio stations